Deutsche Elektronische Musik 2 is a 2013 compilation album released by Soul Jazz Records in 2013. It was a follow-up to their 2010 record Deutsche Elektronische Musik with further tracks covering West German krautrock groups and their music released between 1971 and 1983. It received positive reviews from music publications such as AllMusic, Uncut and Record Collector as well as newspapers such as The Independent and The Province.

Music
John Lewis of Uncut noted the variety of music on the album, describing it as a "hipster-friendly rebranding of what is, effectively, progressive rock from West Germany." Lewis described the variety of music from space-age electronica (Michael Hoenig and Pyrolator), proto-techno of Asmus Tietchens), and Afro-tinged funk (Can's "Halleluwah", Niagra's trance-like "Gibli"), as well as jazz-rock (Gila and Bröselmaschine). Oregano Rathbone of Record Collector noted the artists on the compilation, stating it contained the "big hitters" of the scene (Can, Faust, Amon Düül II,  NEU!, and Popol Vuh while still containing obscurities such as Bröselmaschine, Niagara, You and Asmus Tietchens.

Release
Deutsche Elektronische Musik  2 was announced in early 2013. The album was released in March 2013 on vinyl, compact disc and as a digital download. A follow-up release, Deutsche Elektronische Musik 3 was released in December 2017. After being out of print for over eight years, the album was re-released by Soul Jazz Records in a box set on vinyl on September 4, 2021.

Reception

Andy Kellman of AllMusic gave the album a four-star rating, noting again the absence of Kraftwerk on the album, while still proclaiming that the album was "another smart sampling that, depending on the listener's level of knowledge, can function either as an entry point or as a gap filler; most of the parent albums are within a range of good to tremendous." Oregano Rathbone of Record Collector also awarded the album four stars making similar statements to Kellman, noting the absence of Kraftwerk but that the album was a solid mixture of well known and obscure groups of the genre that "still
sounds like the future." Nick Coleman of The Independent gave the album a four out of five rating, referring to the album as a "sterling mix of bravery, innocence and playfulness." Stuart Derdeyn of The Province praised the album calling it "brilliantly curated" and declaring that it reinforces "the argument that some of the most interesting, progressive and cutting-edge music of the era was coming out of Germany."

Track listing
Track listing adapted from the album's liner notes and sleeve.

Disc 2

References

Sources
 
 
 
 
 

2013 compilation albums
Soul Jazz Records compilation albums
Krautrock albums